Paula Chalmers (born 8 June 1972) is a Scottish former rugby union player who made more than 70 appearances for the Scotland women's national rugby union team.

International career
She played club rugby for Murrayfield Wanderers RFC.

She was representing Scotland at both rugby and hockey until in 1996. After hockey internationals against Ireland and France, she decided it was impossible to continue with both sports at the same level. She opted to pursue playing rugby at international level while limiting her hockey involvement to playing at club level.

She played in the 2002 Women's Rugby World Cup. She was the top points scorer in the 2005 Women's Six Nations Championship with 46 points from five matches. She won her seventieth cap in 2006.

She was selected as captain for Scotland at the 2006 Women's Rugby World Cup. The team finished 6th at the tournament and she scored 27 points during the matches.

Family
Her brother Craig Chalmers won 60 caps for Scotland.

References

1972 births
Living people
Scotland women's international rugby union players
Scottish female rugby union players
Scottish female field hockey players